Krzywa may refer to the following places in Poland:
Krzywa, Lower Silesian Voivodeship (south-west Poland)
Krzywa, Bielsk County in Podlaskie Voivodeship (north-east Poland)
Krzywa, Mońki County in Podlaskie Voivodeship (north-east Poland)
Krzywa, Sokółka County in Podlaskie Voivodeship (north-east Poland)
Krzywa, Lesser Poland Voivodeship (south Poland)
Krzywa, Subcarpathian Voivodeship (south-east Poland)
Krzywa, Lubusz Voivodeship (west Poland)